Kyrgyz-Chek is a village in Osh Region of Kyrgyzstan. It is part of the Kara-Suu District. Its population was 6,196 in 2021.

Population

Notable people
 

Jyldyz Joldosheva (born 1960), Kyrgyz politician

References

Populated places in Osh Region